The 2021–22 Purdue Boilermakers women's basketball team represented Purdue University during the 2021–22 NCAA Division I women's basketball season. The Boilermakers, led by 1st year head coach Katie Gearlds, played their home games at Mackey Arena and were a members of the Big Ten Conference.

They finished the season 17–15 and 7–11 in Big Ten play to finish in a tie for ninth place.  As the ninth seed in the Big Ten tournament, they were defeated by Michigan State in the Second Round.  They received an at-large bid to the  WNIT.  They defeated  in the First Round before losing to Marquette in the Second Round to end their season.

Previous season
The Boilermakers finished the season 7–16 and 4–14 in Big Ten play to finish in twelfth place.  As the eleventh seed in the Big Ten tournament, they were defeated by Iowa in the Second Round.  They were not invited to the NCAA tournament or the WNIT.

Roster

Schedule

Source:

|-
!colspan=6 style=| Exhibition

|-
!colspan=6 style=| Regular season

|-
!colspan=6 style=| Big Ten Women's Tournament

|-
!colspan=6 style=| WNIT

Rankings

The Coaches Poll did not release a Week 2 poll and the AP Poll did not release a poll after the NCAA Tournament.

References

Purdue Boilermakers women's basketball seasons
Purdue
Purdue
Purdue
Purdue